Snowbar (sometimes spelled Snobar) is a popular bar/pool/restaurant in Ramallah.

In 2010 the New York Times described Snowbar as "the hottest spot in Ramallah". The Thursday night dance party with a live band is especially popular, drawing hundreds of young people who dance under flashing red, yellow and blue disco lights.  Almost a decade later, the parties are fewer, and Snowbar hosts events that are as unique as the place itself.

Located on a hillside a few minutes from the city center, has a bar, restaurant, swimming pool, and outdoor space for relaxing under the pine trees from which it takes its name (snowbar is Arabic for "pine"). On cold nights, the Snowbar builds huge bonfires and patrons sit under the pines cooled by the breeze as they take in the sweeping views of the Ramallah skyline by night.

Like hot destinations everywhere, Snowbar has bouncers, in this case posted to enforce a "couples and families only" policy, keeping out groups of single men who might, as has happened in the past, become rowdy.  Snowbar creates an atmostphere where people feel safe to enjoy themselves, relax, and have fun.  By daylight, the club caters to families, working professionals, and many others who come to swim and dine under the pine trees.

In the summer of 2019, Snowbar is hosting swim lessons for children and adults, as well as a Wellness Program to provide a variety of group fitness classes on the pool deck in the beautiful surroundings - look for Zumba, Body Weight Training, Yoga, Water Yoga, and Hydrotherapy.

References

Restaurants in Ramallah